Scytodes globula, the Chilean tiger spider, is a predatory spider of the family Scytodidae. It has achieved fame by being the only natural predator of the extremely common and dangerous Chilean recluse spider (Loxosceles laeta).

Description and habitat 

The adult Chilean tiger spider's size varies from 30 up to 70 mm. Its body is small (specially if compared to the size of its legs, which are usually between three and four times the size of its body). It has slow movements and it hunts only at night.

The spider is native to South America (it is common in Chile, but can be found in other parts of South America, specifically in Argentina, Uruguay and Bolivia).
It lives mostly inside houses in dark and hidden places such as behind frames or in closets, but it can also be frequently found outdoors under Eucalyptus trees.

Hunting method

The hunting method of the Chilean tiger spider is quite characteristic and it is the origin of one of its nicknames, the spitting spider. At night, the spider stealthily approaches its prey and then contracts its abdomen projecting an extremely sticky and resistant spider-web, which imprisons its prey even if it is larger than the spider; then, once the prey is verified to be immobilized, the spider injects its poison, secreted from its second venom gland.

Prey
The Chilean tiger spider preys on flies, mosquitoes, bees, horse-flies, and other insects. However it also eats other kinds of spiders, and it has become famous for being the only natural predator of the common and dangerous recluse spider (Loxosceles laeta).

Webs
The Chilean tiger spider builds barely elaborated spider-webs and only in its refuges.

Bites
It is extremely unlikely for the Chilean tiger spider to attack beings that are more than twice its size (mainly because of its hunting methods), so an attack on a human being has almost no chance of happening. It has been declared by several studies of Chilean Universities to be "innocuous to human beings". There are no clinical records of attacks on humans.

Relationship with the Chilean recluse spider
Due to having a similar thermal and environmental preference, it is common for the tiger spider to live near the chilean recluse spider which indicates a high probability of encounters and predation from part of the tiger spider, for which it's famous. A study of the behaviour and interaction of the two spiders from University of Chile consisted of 25 experiments, where only 15 of the meetings ended up in an encounter between the two, with the tiger spider killing the chilean recluse spider in 12 of them. Regardless of the results of this small experiment, the status of the tiger spider as a predator of the chilean recluse spider remains up for debate, and more studies have to be done to conclusively determine this.

References

Sources
 

https://web.archive.org/web/20130318031224/http://www2.udec.cl/~aracnologia/comun/tigre.html

Scytodidae
Fauna of Chile
Spiders of South America
Spiders described in 1849